William Orme may refer to:

 William W. Orme (1832–1866), United States Army general
 William Orme (minister) (1787–1830), Scottish Congregational minister